The Key Words Reading Scheme is a series of 36 English language early readers children's books, published by the British publishing company, Ladybird Books. The series are also often referred to as Peter and Jane, the names of the main characters.

History
The first book in the series, Ladybird series 641, was published in 1964, and the series was completed by the first publication of the 36th book in 1967. Over 80 million books in the series have been sold worldwide, and the books remain in print in 2012.

The books were designed as materials for teaching a small child to learn to read, using a system of key phrases and words devised by teacher William Murray.  Murray was an educational adviser at a borstal and later headmaster of a "school for the educationally subnormal" in Cheltenham.  From research undertaken in the 1950s by Murray with Professor Joe McNally, an educational psychologist at the University of Manchester, Murray realised that only 12 words account for a quarter of the vocabulary used in normal speaking, reading and writing in the English language, 100 words for half, and 300 words for three-quarters.

Starting with book 1a, a budding reader of primary school age, from 3 to 5 years old, is introduced to brother and sister Peter and Jane, their dog Pat, their Mummy and Daddy, and their home, toys, playground, the beach, shops, buses and trains, and so on.  The first book uses the 12 key words which are used repeatedly ("Here is Peter", "Peter is here", "Here is Jane", "Jane is here", "I like Peter", "I like Jane").  Additional words are introduced gradually, page by page, to expand the reader's reading vocabulary, with the new words on each page set out in a footnote.  The reader can consolidate their learning with books 1b, or practise writing in book 1c, all with the same vocabulary; or progress to book 2a (and 2b and 2c), and so on, with 12 sets of three books in all.

Two more characters, Simon and John, were introduced further into the series, as the books developed in length and detail to become targeted at growing children who had developed further reading skills. These two characters are cousins of Peter and Jane.

Illustrations
All of the books are small, thin hardback volumes with 56 pages, measuring 112×170 mm (4½" × 6¾").  Each book has text on a left page and an illustration on the facing right page, drawn by artists Harry Wingfield, Martin Aitchison, Frank Hampson, Robert Ayton and John Berry.  The illustrations vary in style from book to book, depending on artist, but Peter and Jane are recognisable throughout.   The clear sans serif typeface used in the books starts at a large size and gradually becomes smaller as the reader progresses through the series.  The sentence structure also becomes gradually more complex.

The books were first published in 1964, with a firmly 1950s feel to the illustrations provided by the furniture and clothing depicted, and the social context reflecting the life of a white, middle-class family.  The books were revised and updated in 1970, and again in the late 1970s, to reflect changes in fashions and in social attitudes.  For example, golliwogs were airbrushed out; Daddy takes a more active domestic role; and Jane moved out of skirts and dresses into jeans, and abandoned her dolly for rollerskates. However,  Peter still goes out to help Daddy, or actively plays with a ball, while Jane stays indoors to help Mummy, passively watches Peter, or plays with her doll.

List of books 

 1a: Play with us
 1b: Look at this
 1c: Read and write
 2a: We have fun
 2b: Have a go
 2c: I like to write
 3a: Things we like
 3b: Boys and girls
 3c: Let me write
 4a: Things we do
 4b: Fun at the farm
 4c: Say the sound
 5a: Where we go
 5b: Out in the sun
 5c: More sounds to say
 6a: Our friends
 6b: We like to help
 6c: Reading with sounds
 7a: Happy holiday
 7b: Fun and games
 7c: Easy to sound
 8a: Sunny days
 8b: The big house
 8c: Fun with sounds
 9a: Games we like
 9b: Jump from the sky
 9c: Enjoying reading
 10a: Adventure on the island
 10b: Adventure at the castle
 10c: Learning is fun
 11a: Mystery on the island
 11b: The carnival
 11c: Books are exciting
 12a: The holiday camp mystery
 12b: Mountain adventure
 12c: The open door to reading

Updates
Few changes have been made to the books since the 1970s, and they may be considered a source of social history. The books make use of the whole word or "look and say" technique which is generally considered outmoded as a method of reading education when not used in conjunction with phonics. Nevertheless, the books remain on sale in 2013, priced relatively cheaply at around £2.99 per book.

Worldwide sales
In some Asian countries, particularly those which are also part of the British Commonwealth, the books are still widely used as a teaching aid in nurseries, preschools and kindergartens.

See also

Dick and Jane
Janet and John
Harry Wingfield

References and external links
See all the KEY WORDS READING SCHEME books
Read about the original JANE from the Key Words books
Peter, Jane and Harry, The Guardian, 22 January 2002
History of Ladybird books

Basal readers
Early childhood education in the United Kingdom
Early childhood educational organizations
Series of children's books
1964 in literature
1964 children's books
Learning to read
Reading (process)